Watch Your Stern is a 1960 British comedy film directed by Gerald Thomas and starring Kenneth Connor, Eric Barker and Leslie Phillips.  The film was based on the play Something About a Sailor by Earle Couttie. The Royal Navy provided cooperation, allowing the producers to film in Chatham Dockyard, and aboard HMS Jaguar and HMS Chaplet.

The film shares its cast and production team with the Carry On films, but is not an official member of the Carry On series. It also has similarities to the long-running BBC radio series The Navy Lark.

It is the only film to feature Sid James with a full beard (Royal Navy style) and the first to feature Spike Milligan in his Indian character.

Plot
HMS Terrier, a Royal Navy warship, is docked at Chatham Royal Dockyard. The officers are drinking gin and tonics in the captain's quarters while the crew are down below being given casual but technical lectures by Seaman Blissworth, who is very knowledgeable about torpedoes. An American Naval Commander (Philips) arrives on board to discuss plans for a new "acoustic torpedo".

Blissworth accidentally spills a drink on the secret plans and hangs it out to dry in front of a heater. He swaps the folded secret plan for other plans (for the ice unit). The heater burns a hole in the secret plan. They try and hide the fact from a fiery visiting Admiral.

The visiting Commander, now en route to London has the only surviving plan. Blissworth is sent on a bicycle to catch him. This fails as he is not allowed out without a pass.

Meanwhile Admiral Pettigrew wants to see the plans. He has already encountered Blissworth on his bike so stage one is to throw the bike overboard. It is decided to disguise Blissworth as a scientific expert, Professor Potter. In order to achieve this he has the petty officer's generous beard glued onto his chin, glasses are added and he adopts a Scottish accent. He convinces the visitor that the circuit diagram of a refrigeration unit is actually that of the torpedo. At the same time, the real scientist turns out to be female, Agatha Potter, and phones to say she will be late. The confusion causes her to be arrested as a suspected spy.

Meanwhile Petty Officer Mundy is ordered to shave off the remains of his whiskers (as the only two Royal Navy options are clean shaven or "full set").

Blissworth then is re-disguised as a woman: Agatha Potter. He is collected by the Admiral's secretary and taken to Admiralty House to meet the Admiral. He is there when the real Agatha calls and exposes him. He gets out and gets a lift with the returning American commander in his car, where he manages to get the correct torpedo plan back. Back on the ship he returns the plan and quickly gets changed back to uniform before the admiral returns with the real professor. As he tries to sneak out he cannot help but interrupt the discussion and discovers the flaw in the current design.

He is invited to work with the professor on the design. When the first torpedo is eventually fired it turns around and blows up their own ship.

Cast
 Kenneth Connor as Ordinary Seaman Blissworth
 Sid James as Chief Petty Officer Mundy
 Joan Sims as Ann Foster
 Hattie Jacques as Agatha Potter
 Eric Barker as Captain David Foster
 Leslie Phillips as Lieutenant Commander Bill Fanshawe
 Noel Purcell as Admiral Sir Humphrey Pettigrew
 Spike Milligan as Ranjid - Civilian electrician #1
 Eric Sykes as Civilian electrician #2
 David Lodge as Admiralty Constabulary Sergeant
 Victor Maddern as Sailor fishing for bike
 Ed Devereaux as Commander Phillips USN
 Robin Ray as Flag Lieutenant (aide to the admiral)
 George Street as Second Admiralty Constabulary guard
 Peter Howell as Admiral's secretary

Box Office
Kine Weekly called it a "money maker" at the British box office in 1960.

References

External links

1960 films
1960 comedy films
1960s English-language films
British comedy films
Films shot at Pinewood Studios
Films directed by Gerald Thomas
Films produced by Peter Rogers
Military humor in film
British films based on plays
1960s British films